Timothy Harold Welsford (born 22 April 1982) was a professional cricketer who captained the Australia Under-19 cricket team in one Under-19 Test match and three Under-19 One Day Internationals.  He also made five List A appearances for Victoria in 2004 and 2005.

References

External links
 

1982 births
Sportspeople from Bendigo
Australian cricketers
Victoria cricketers
Living people
Cricketers from Victoria (Australia)